Tubulointerstitial nephritis and uveitis (TINU) is a rare medical condition in which there is uveitis (inflammation of the uvea in the eye) together with tubulointerstitial nephritis (inflammation of the tubules inside the kidney).

Symptoms and signs
Uveitis may cause pain of the affected eye together with changes in vision. It may be accompanied by nonspecific systemic symptoms such as fever, involuntary weight loss, fatigue, loss of appetite, abdominal pain, and joint pains.

Laboratory diagnosis
We can see increased eosinophils under microscope after biopsy.

Management

History 
It was first described in 1975.

References

External links 

Kidney diseases
Disorders of iris and ciliary body
Rare diseases